Dudley is an unincorporated community and census-designated place (CDP) in Wayne County, North Carolina, United States, about 9 miles south of Goldsboro. It was first listed as a CDP in the 2020 census with a population of 826. Dudley is included in the Goldsboro, North Carolina Metropolitan Statistical Area.

History
Another town named Dudley originally existed several miles north from its current location. It was founded by Labon Lewis, the son of a Revolutionary soldier, named for his deceased brother Dudley Lewis. On January 13, 1840, a post office was established for this town. This office's name was later changed to Everettsville, which was moved to a new location in 1849 and was closed in 1866.

The second and present town bearing the name was set up around 1836-1840 as a camp for the Wilmington & Weldon Railroad. This time, however, it was named for Governor Edward B. Dudley, the railroad's founder. In the years in which the village grew, it gained a depot and a passenger station. Its post office was established on February 3, 1850.

In December 1862, during the Battle of Goldsboro Bridge, a number of
buildings and railroad cars were destroyed in Dudley by the Union Army under
Maj. Gen. John G. Foster.

Dudley was incorporated in 1897, with J. W. Hatch elected as the town's first mayor. The town's government lasted for many years until eventually no more officials were elected and the incorporation ended.

The Georgia Pacific Corporation opened a facility in Dudley in 1973 and now employs over 625 people.

Demographics

2020 census

Note: the US Census treats Hispanic/Latino as an ethnic category. This table excludes Latinos from the racial categories and assigns them to a separate category. Hispanics/Latinos can be of any race.

Education
Education in Dudley is administered by the Wayne County Public School system with children attending classes at Brogden Primary School, Brogden Middle School and Southern Wayne High School. Higher education is offered through Wayne Community College in Goldsboro and Mount Olive College in Mount Olive.

Transportation

Passenger
Air: Raleigh-Durham International Airport is the closest major airport with service to more than 45 domestic and international destinations. Goldsboro-Wayne Municipal Airport is an airport located nearby, but is only used for general aviation.
Interstate Highway: I-795 is the closest Interstate to Dudley, which is located 9 miles north in Goldsboro.
Dudley is not served directly by passenger trains. The closest Amtrak station is located in Selma.
Bus: The area is served by Greyhound with a location in nearby Goldsboro.

Roads
The main highway in Dudley is US 117.

Notable people
 Cecil Exum, former University of North Carolina and Australian NBL basketball player
 Tim Pratt, science fiction/fantasy writer and poet
 Greg Warren, American football player

References

2.  See also:  http://www.usgennet.org/usa/nc/county/wayne/articles/dudley.htm

Census-designated places in North Carolina
Census-designated places in Wayne County, North Carolina
Unincorporated communities in North Carolina
Unincorporated communities in Wayne County, North Carolina
Populated places established in 1836
1836 establishments in North Carolina